Garth Davis (born 1974) is an Australian television, advertising and film director, best known for directing the film Lion (2016), and the film Mary Magdalene, written by Helen Edmundson. He earlier directed episodes of the series Top of the Lake (2013).

Early life
Garth Davis was born in 1974.

Career 
Davis directed several episodes of the series Top of the Lake (2013).

In October 2013, Warner Bros. Pictures hired Davis to direct a film adaptation of Shantaram, but that did not come to fruition; instead, it was later made into a television adaptation for Apple TV+.

He directed The Weinstein Company film Lion, in his feature film directorial debut, which premiered to rave reviews at the Toronto International Film Festival in 2016.

In January 2016, Davis was hired to direct a biopic about Mary Magdalene, titled  Mary Magdalene, written by Helen Edmundson. The film had its world premiere at the National Portrait Gallery in London in February 2018.

In 2019, Davis teamed up with See-Saw Films joint directors Emile Sherman and Iain Canning in a new production company called I AM THAT, with Samantha Lang as head of development.

In August 2020, it was announced that Davis would direct an as yet untitled sequel to Tron: Legacy, for Walt Disney Pictures.

In April 2022, Screen Australia announced funding for Immersion, a science fiction drama TV series to be directed by Davis, written by Matt Vesely (Aftertaste) and executive produced by Emile Sherman (The King's Speech) and director/producer Samantha Lang.

Awards
2008:  Gold Lion at the Cannes Lions International Festival of Creativity, and a D&AD Yellow Pencil, for the Schweppes commercial "Burst"
2010: Finalist in the Directors Guild of America Award for Best Commercials Director
2013: Emmy Award for Direction for Top of the Lake (which also won three other Emmys)
2016: Lion was nominated for six Oscars at the 89th Academy Awards in 2016, including Best Picture
2016: Directors Guild of America Award for best direction, Lion

Personal life
Davis lives in Australia with his three children and partner Nicola Lester.

Filmography

Film 

Short films

Television

References

External links 
 

1974 births
Living people
Australian film directors
Australian television directors
Advertising directors